Saram Entertainment is an entertainment company in South Korea, founded by Lee So-young in 2006 and partakes in artist management and film production.

Current artists

Actors
 Byun Yo-han
 Cho Jin-woong
 Choi Min-young
 Choi Soo-young
 Choi Won-young
 David Lee McInnis
 Go Jun
 Gong Myung
 Han Ye-ri
 Honey Lee
 Hong Ki-joon
 Jeon Chae-eun
 Jeong So-ri
 Jung Hoyeon
 Jung In-ji 
 Ki Hong Lee
 Kim Jae-young 
 Kim Min-ha
 Kim Sung-kyu
 Kim Yu-an
 Kwon Yul
 Lee Ga-sub
 Lee Hae-woo 
 Lee Joo-young
 Lee Seo-jun 
 Lee Sung-wook
 Lee Woon-san
 Min Seong-wook 
 Moon Dong-hyeok
 Park Gyu-young
 Park Ye-jin
 Seo Ha-jeong 
 Shim Dal-gi
 Song Jae-rim 
 Uhm Jung-hwa
 Yoo Hee-jae
 Yoon So-hee

Films

2010s

References

External links

Talent agencies of South Korea
Talent agencies
Film production companies of South Korea